Perra may refer to:

 Athanasia Perra (born 1983), Greek triple jumper
 Clara Perra (1954–2015), Italian percussionist, pianist and composer
 Spanish for 'bitch' (female dog), see Spanish profanity
 La Perra, a 1967 Argentine film
 "Perra", a J Balvin song

See also
 Perras, a 2011 Mexican film